Peg of Old Drury is a 1935 British historical film directed by Herbert Wilcox and starring Anna Neagle, Cedric Hardwicke and Margaretta Scott. The film is a biopic of eighteenth-century Irish actress Peg Woffington. It was based on the play Masks and Faces by Charles Reade and Tom Taylor. It contains passages of eighteenth century Shakespearian performance, from The Merchant of Venice, Richard III and As You Like It.

The film was voted the third best British movie of 1936. Wilcox said the film "was enormously successful both here and in the States, artistically as well as at the box office."

Plot

The film is a very affectionate look at the life of Peg, and her relationship with David Garrick. It is a lavish costume drama and recreates a Hogarth-type atmosphere of contemporary London in the mid 18th century. It is laced with snippets of legendary history such as Lord Sandwich's invention of the sandwich. Peg is generally more popular with the men than with the women, particularly her fellow female actors. The films has it that Peg dies off stage at the end of the film.

Cast
 Anna Neagle ...  Peg Woffington
 Cedric Hardwicke ...  David Garrick 
 Margaretta Scott ...  Kitty Clive 
 Maire O'Neill ...  Mrs. Woffington – Peg's Mother 
 Arthur Sinclair ...  Mr. Woffington – Peg's Father 
 Dorothy Robinson ...  Mrs. Margaret Dalloway 
 Polly Emery ...  Martha the Maid 
 Aubrey Fitzgerald ...  Digby 
 Jack Hawkins ...  Michael O'Taffe 
 Robert Atkins ...  Dr. Samuel Johnson
 Hay Petrie ...  John Rich
 George Barrett ...  Tom – Stage Doorkeeper 
 Stuart Robertson ...  Singer 
 Leslie French ...  Alexander Pope 
 Tom Heslewood ...  William Pitt, 1st Earl of Chatham
 Christopher Steele ...  Oliver Goldsmith 
 Eliot Makeham ...  Dr. Bowdler 
 Sara Allgood ...  Irish Woman on Boat

Critical reception
The New York Times wrote, "with superb acting, photography that is effective and unusual, yet not bizarre, and direction that is gentleness and good taste itself, Peg of Old Drury is one of the finest cinema production ever to come out of England, or of anywhere else, for that matter"; while TV Guide wrote, "Neagle and Hardwicke give impressive performances, and the excerpts from Shakespeare and Jonson are flawlessly mounted. Much of the film's power derives from the screenplay by actor Malleson in his first screenwriting assignment." Graham Greene, writing for The Spectator, gave a more mixed review suggesting that there is "no historical truth to be found anywhere in the deft, neat tale". Greene remarked on the attractiveness of Neagle and found that the film was "very pretty", but concluded that "prettiness is a quality one wants, if at all, in small quantities".

References

External links

1935 films
British biographical films
Films set in the 18th century
Films set in London
1930s English-language films
Films directed by Herbert Wilcox
British films based on plays
British historical films
1930s historical films
British black-and-white films
British and Dominions Studios films
Films shot at Imperial Studios, Elstree
1930s British films